Mirels' score is a tool useful in the management of bone tumors, by identifying those patients who would benefit from prophylactic fixation if they have a high enough risk of pathological fracture.

Scoring

A score of 1 to 3 is given for four criteria and summed together. A score greater than 8 suggests prophylactic internal fixation prior to irradiation.

References

Further reading

External links
 Orthobullets

Orthopedic clinical prediction rules